Anders Trentemøller (born 16 October 1972) is a Danish indie/electronic music composer, producer and multi-instrumentalist based in Copenhagen, Denmark.

History
Trentemøller started music in the late 1990s with different indie rock projects.  In 2006, following a line of more electronic-orientated 12-inch EPs, Trentemøller released his debut album, The Last Resort. In 2007 he assembled his first full live band, with Henrik Vibskov on drums and Mikael Simpson on guitar. Complete with visuals from director Karim Ghahwagi, the ensuing ‘Trentemøller: Live In Concert’ tour brought him to the United States for the first time as well as to festivals including Glastonbury (UK), Roskilde (Denmark) and Melt! (Germany).

In 2009, The Trentemøller Chronicles, a double compilation of unreleased songs, non-album tracks and remixes for acts including Röyksopp, Moby and The Knife, was released. He also headlined the Orange Stage at Roskilde Festival, playing in front of 60,000 people, with a set design created by Vibskov.

After starting up his own record label, In My Room, Trentemøller's second album Into the Great Wide Yonder was released in 2010. It was a move into a more analogue sound influenced by indie and post-punk, and incorporating more live instrumentation and vocals. Expanding his live band to seven people, he continued to tour around the world for two years. His appearance at 2011's Coachella Festival was described by NME as “one of the biggest breakouts of Coachella,” saying he “stunned all onlookers and became the toast of the fest.” Trentemøller toured widely across the US and appeared on Carson Daly. The world tour ended with two shows in Christiania, Copenhagen, released as the live album Live In Copenhagen.

Following his second album, Reworked/Remixed was released, a compilation of Trentemøller's remixes for other artists and other musicians' reworking of his music including Modeselektor, UNKLE, Franz Ferdinand, Andrew Weatherall, Efterklang and Depeche Mode. Trentemøller's music has also been used by film directors, including Oliver Stone (Savages), Pedro Almodóvar (The Skin I Live In), and Jacques Audiard (Rust and Bone).

In September 2013, Trentemøller released his third full-length album Lost, including collaborations with Low, Jonny Pierce from The Drums, Marie Fisker, Kazu Makino of Blonde Redhead, Jana Hunter of Lower Dens, Ghost Society and Sune Wagner of The Raveonettes. That year, Trentemøller also supported Depeche Mode on their Delta Machine world tour and appeared at Melt!, Dour, Pitch and Zurich Open Air. In 2014, Trentemøller composed the theme for the AMC series Halt and Catch Fire. In 2014, Lost was awarded a silver certification from the Independent Music Companies Association, which indicated sales of at least 20,000 copies throughout Europe.

Trentemøller's fourth album, Fixion, was released on 16 September 2016. It featured vocals by Marie Fisker, Lisbet Fritze and Jehnny Beth.

A fifth album, Obverse, was released in 2019. It was nominated for IMPALA's European Independent Album of the Year Award 2019, but did not win.

Trentemøller has frequently collaborated with Swedish artist Andreas Emenius, who directed music videos for the songs Come Undone (2014), Deceive (2014), Complicated (2016), and Redefine (2016).

Style and influences
Trentemøller's later music has been described as synthwave and pop. His early tracks (especially those on The Last Resort) show influences drawing from early downtempo and trip hop, minimal, glitch, and darkwave, often incorporating a cinematic feel. He cited amongst his influences Siouxsie and the Banshees, My Bloody Valentine, Slowdive, Joy Division, and Depeche Mode.

Discography

Albums

Compilations

 2007 – The Trentemøller Chronicles
 2009 – Harbour Boat Trips 01
 2011 – Reworked/Remixed
 2011 – Late Night Tales
 2014 – Lost Reworks
 2014 – Early Worx
 2018 – Harbour Boat Trips 02

Singles and EPs

 2003 – Trentemøller EP
 2004 – Beta Boy
 2005 – Physical Fraction
 2005 – Kink
 2005 – Polar Shift
 2005 – Serenetti
 2006 – Sunstroke
 2006 – Nam Nam E.P.
 2006 – Rykketid
 2006 – Always Something Better
 2007 – An Evening With Bobi Bros (woith DJ Tom) / 25 Timer (with Vildtand, Krede, Buda)
 2007 – African People
 2007 – Moan - IFPI DEN: Platinum
 2007 – Gamma (with Buda)
 2007 – Moan (Dub & Instrumental)
 2007 – Take Me Into Your Skin (Nudisco Edit)
 2008 – Miss You (Remixes)
 2008 – Live in Concert EP (Live at Roskilde 2007)
 2009 – Vamp / Miss You 2009 – Rauta EP (with DJ Lab) 2010 – Sycamore Feeling 2010 – ... Even Though You're With Another Girl 2010 – Silver Surfer, Ghost Rider Go!!! 2011 – Shades Of Marble (Remixes) 2011 – Raincoats / Tide (with Efterklang) 2012 – My Dreams 2013 – Never Stop Running 2013 – Candy Tongue 2013 – Gravity 2014 – Deceive 2016 – River in Me 2016 – Redefine 2017 – One Eye Open 2017 – Complicated 2017 – Hands Down 2018 – Transformer Man 2019 – SleeperDocumentary

 2017 – The Science of FixionProduction work

 2004 – Mikael Simpson - Er Du Kommet For A Faa Noget? 2006 – Mikael Simpson – Mist Dig Selv I Mig 2008 – Det som ingen ved (movie soundtrack) 2011 – Darkness Falls – Alive In Us 2012 – Dorit Chrysler - Avalanche
 2014 – Giana Factory – Lemon Moon 2018 – 2nd Blood – Running BlindRemixes

 1999 – ETA – Ayia Napa
 2003 – Kvinde Din - Møgluder (with DJ T.O.M.)
 2003 – The Orchestra — Expansion
 2003 – Filur – You & I
 2003 – B & B International – Decorated With Ornaments (with Banzai Republic)
 2003 – Laid Back – Beautiful Day (with Banzai Republic)
 2003 – Malou – I Wish
 2003 – Djuma Soundsystem – Les Djinns
 2003 – Andy Caldwell & Jay-J  – Give a Little
 2004 – Jokeren - Kvinde Din (with DJ T.O.M.)
 2004 – Yoshimoto – Du What U Du
 2004 – Pashka – Island Breeze
 2004 – The Rhythm Slaves – The Light You Will See
 2004 – Aya – Uptown
 2004 – Aphex Twin – Windowlicker (with Buda) (Unofficial)
 2005 – Laid Back – People (with Banzai Republic)
 2005 – Mathias Schaffhauser – Coincidance
 2005 – Fred Everything & 20 for 7 – Friday
 2005 – Vernis – Bubble Bath
 2005 – Varano – Dead End Street
 2005 – Pet Shop Boys – Sodom
 2005 – Sharon Phillips – Want 2/Need 2
 2005 – Unai – Oh You and I
 2005 – Martinez – Shadowboxing
 2005 – Röyksopp – What Else Is There?
 2005 – The Knife – We Share Our Mothers' Health
 2005 – Moby – Go
 2006 – Blue Foundation – As I Moved On (with Buda)
 2006 – Djosos Krost – Chapter One
 2006 – Peace & Adventure - High On Love
 2006 – Jokke Ilsoe – Feeling Good
 2006 – Trentemøller – Always Something Better
 2007 – Trentemøller – Moan
 2007 – JaConfetti – Hold Nu Kay
 2007 – Robyn – Konichiwa Bitches
 2007 – Klovn – McKlaren
 2007 – The Blacksmoke Organisation – Danger Global Warming
 2007 – Tomboy – Flamingo
 2007 – Kira Skov - Religiously Young
 2008 – Kasper Bjørke – Doesn't Matter
 2008 – The Raveonettes – Aly, Walk With Me
 2008 – The Raveonettes – Lust
 2008 – Modeselektor – The White Flash (feat. Thom Yorke)
 2008 – Trentemøller – Miss You
 2008 – Lulu Rouge – Bless You
 2008 – Booka Shade – Outskirts
 2009 – Mikael Simpson – Medicin
 2009 – Visti & Meyland – Yes Maam (All Nite Long)
 2009 – Favelachic – Jungle-TV (with DJ T.O.M.)
 2009 – Chris Isaak - Wicked Game (Unofficial)
 2009 – Depeche Mode – Wrong
 2009 – Franz Ferdinand – No You Girls
 2010 – Trentemøller – Sycamore Feeling
 2010 – Trentemøller – Silver Surfer, Ghost Rider Go!!!
 2010 – Lars and The Hands Of Light – Me Me Me
 2010 – Mew – Beach
 2010 – Trigbag - Treasure (with DJ T.O.M.); Future Disco; Spread The Music; In The Sunshine
 2011 – UNKLE – The Answer (feat. Big In Japan)
 2011 – Chimes & Bells – The Mole
 2011 – Chimes & Bells – This Far
 2011 – Trentemøller – Shades Of Marble
 2011 – Efterklang – Raincoats
 2011 – The Dø – Too Insistent
 2011 – Giana Factory – Dirty Snow
 2011 – Sleep Party People – The Dwarf And The Horse
 2011 – Darkness Falls – The Void
 2011 – Darkness Falls – Timeline
 2011 – Trentemøller – Neverglade
 2011 – Bruce Springsteen — State Trooper (Unofficial)
 2011 – I Got You On Tape – Springsteen
 2011 – Dorit Chrysler – Come On Home
 2011 – M83 – Midnight City
 2012 – The Drums – Days
 2012 – Lower Dens — Brains
 2012 – Medina – Forever
 2012 – Mikael Simpson – Lad Det Staa
 2012 – David Lynch – Pinky's Dream
 2013 – Howl Baby Howl — That Good Night
 2013 – The Warlocks — Shake The Dope Out
 2013 – Jakob Bro — Terrace Place
 2014 – Reptile Youth – JJ
 2014 – Jenny Wilson – Pyramids (Rose Out of Our Pain)
 2014 – Eliot Sumner - Information
 2014 – Fraser Mcguinness - The Sun Moves On
 2014 – Future 3 feat. Benoit Pioulard - Revenant
 2014 – RA - Prism
 2014 – Trentemøller — River Of Life
 2014 – Trentemøller — Come Undone
 2014 – Trentemøller — Deceive
 2014 – Mames Babegenush - A Woman (feat. Reculture)
 2016 – Mellemblond - Nord
 2016 – The Soft Moon - Black
 2016 – Kira Skov - I Celebrate My Life
 2016 – Jennylee - Boom Boom
 2016 – Trentemøller — River In Me
 2016 – Savages - Surrender
 2017 – UNKLE — Looking for the Rain
 2017 – TOYDRUM feat. Joel Wells - Void & Form
 2017 – Trentemøller — One Eye Open
 2017 – Trentemøller — Hands Down
 2018 – A Place To Bury Strangers — Never Coming Back
 2020 – School of X — Write My Name
 2020 – 2nd Blood — Turn It Back
 2020 – Blaue Blume — Lovable
 2020 – ReMission International — TOS2020
 2020 – TOM And His Computer — Puzzle (feat. Roxy Jules)
 2021 – Tricky — Like A Stone
 2021 – Loa & Koan — J.P. and the End of the World
 2022 – The KVB — Lumens
 2022 – Luster — IT FOLLOWS YOU NOW

Awards and nominations
Trentemøller has received two Danish Music Awards for his 2006 debut album The Last Resort, in the categories "Danish Electronica Release of the Year" and "Danish Producer of the Year", in 2007. He was first awarded a Danish DeeJay Award in 2004 for his EP Trentemøller EP'', and have since received a total of 11 awards. In 2010 Trentemøller was nominated "Best Remixed Recording, Non-Classical" at the 52nd Grammy Awards for his remix of Franz Ferdinand's "No You Girls".

References

External links

 Official Trentemøller website
 / Label website

Club DJs
Living people
Danish dance musicians
Danish electronic musicians
Danish house musicians
1972 births
People from Vordingborg Municipality